György Komáromi (born 19 January 2002) is a Hungarian footballer who currently plays as a forward for Puskás Akadémia.

Career statistics

References

2002 births
Living people
Hungarian footballers
Hungary youth international footballers
Hungary under-21 international footballers
Association football forwards
Puskás Akadémia FC players
Csákvári TK players
Nemzeti Bajnokság I players
Nemzeti Bajnokság II players